Anatolidion is a monotypic genus of comb-footed spiders containing the single species, Anatolidion gentile. It was first described by J. Wunderlich in 2008, and is found in Africa and Europe.

See also
 List of Theridiidae species

References

External links

Fauna of Algeria
Fauna of Morocco
Arthropods of Turkey
Monotypic Araneomorphae genera
Spiders of Africa
Spiders of Europe
Theridiidae